Delaware Airpark  is a public use airport serving the Dover area. It is owned by the Delaware Department of Transportation and operated by the Delaware River and Bay Authority and located one nautical mile (2 km) west of the central business district of Cheswold, a town in Kent County, Delaware, United States. It is included in the Federal Aviation Administration (FAA) National Plan of Integrated Airport Systems for 2017–2021, in which it is categorized as a local general aviation facility.

33N is home to Delaware State University's flight training program, providing its students with year-round flying capability. Every May, Dover plays host to NASCAR racing events at the Dover International Speedway. Many race teams, drivers, and fans use Delaware Airpark because of its proximity to the track.

Facilities and aircraft 
Delaware Airpark covers an area of 319 acres (129 ha) at an elevation of 55 feet (17 m) above mean sea level. It has one runway designated 9/27 with an asphalt surface measuring 4,201 by 75 feet (1,092 x 18 m).

For the 12-month period ending December 1, 2011, the airport had 23,100 general aviation aircraft operations, an average of 63 per day. At that time there were 33 aircraft based at this airport: 88% single-engine and 12% multi-engine.

References

External links 
 Delaware Airpark, official site
  at Delaware DOT airport directory
 Aerial image as of March 1992 from USGS The National Map
 
 

Delaware River and Bay Authority facilities
Buildings and structures in Dover, Delaware
Airports in Kent County, Delaware